Eliahu or Eliyahu is a masculine Hebrew given name and surname of biblical origin. It means "My God is Yahweh" and derives from the prophet Elijah who, according to the Bible, lived during the reign of King Ahab (9th century BCE).

People named Eliahu or Eliyahu, include:

Given name

Eliahu
 Eliahu Eilat (1903–1990), Israeli diplomat, Orientalist and President of the Hebrew University of Jerusalem
 Eliahu Gat (1919–1987), Israeli landscape painter
 Eliahu Inbal (born 1936), Israeli conductor
 Eliahu Nissim (born 1933), Israeli former professor of aeronautical engineering and former President of the Open University of Israel
 Eliahu Stern (born 1948), Israeli professor emeritus of geography and planning

Eliyahu
 Eliyahu Bet-Zuri (1922–1945), Jewish Lehi member and assassin
 Eliyahu Berligne (1866–1959), a founder of Tel Aviv, a member of the Yishuv in Mandate Palestine and a signatory of the Israeli declaration of independence
 Eli Cohen (1924–1965), Israeli spy
 Eliyahu Golomb (1893–1945), leader of the Jewish defense effort in Mandate Palestine and chief architect of the Haganah
 Eliyahu Hakim (1925–1945), Jewish Lehi member and assassin
 Eli Ohana (born 1964), Israeli former football player and coach, and current Chairman of Israeli club Beitar Jerusalem
 Eliyahu Moshe Panigel (1850–1919), Sephardi chief rabbi of the Ottoman Empire, Palestine and Jerusalem
 Eliyahu Sasson (1902–1978), Israeli politician and cabinet minister
 Eli Suissa (born 1956), Israeli former politician and cabinet minister

Surname

Eliahu
 Shlomo Eliahu (born 1936), Israeli businessman, billionaire and former politician

Eliyahu
 Eitan Ben Eliyahu (born 1944), retired Israel Defense Forces major general and Israeli Air Force commander
 Lior Eliyahu (born 1985), Israeli basketball player
 Mordechai Eliyahu (1929–2010), Israeli rabbi, posek and Chief Rabbi of Israel
 Shmuel Eliyahu (born 1956), Israeli Orthodox Chief Rabbi of Safed and member of the Chief Rabbinate Council
 Tomer Eliyahu (born 1975), Israeli retired footballer

References

Masculine given names